Wayne McDonald (born ) is a former professional rugby league footballer. McDonald appeared in the Super League playing over 175 games in the 1990s and 2000s. McDonald played his club football for the Wakefield Trinity Wildcats, Hull F.C., St Helens, Leeds Rhinos, Wigan Warriors and the Huddersfield Giants. McDonald retired at the end of the 2006 Super League season ending his 12-year-long career. McDonald was also the tallest player to have played in Super League standing at 6’7”.

McDonald represented Scotland between 1999 and 2005, featuring in the 2000 Rugby League World Cup, and captaining the team in the European Tri-nations tournaments.

McDonald played for the Huddersfield Giants in the 2006 Challenge Cup Final from the interchange bench against St. Helens but the Huddersfield Giants lost 12-42.

McDonald also played for the United Arab Emirates in 2009.

References

External links

Saints Heritage Society profile
2004-06 Season Statistics
Profile at leedsrugby
Salford's newest given chance
Matautia cleared of 'spear' tackle
Super Scots stun France
Warrington feel Saints backlash
Saints wallop sorry Reds
Brilliant Bulls blitz Saints
McDonald moves to Leeds
Arnold seeks French scalp
Wales v Scotland (Sun)
Saints snap up McDonald
Rhinos win Headingley battle
Super League: Round Five round-up
Super League: Round 13 round-up
McDonald boost for Rhinos
Hull add two new faces
Leeds 64-12 Castleford
London 36-36 Leeds
Leeds 70-0 St Helens
McDonald moves to Wigan on loan
Huddersfield 30-42 Bradford
Giants clinch Rhinos' McDonald
Huddersfield release five players
Torrens joins Huddersfield exodus
Maori edge out unlucky Scots

1975 births
Living people
English people of Scottish descent
English rugby league players
Huddersfield Giants players
Hull F.C. players
Leeds Rhinos players
Rugby league players from Leeds
Rugby league props
Rugby league second-rows
Scotland national rugby league team captains
Scotland national rugby league team players
St Helens R.F.C. players
United Arab Emirates national rugby league team players
Wakefield Trinity players
Wigan Warriors players